White Rose is a planned railway station between  and  railway stations on the Huddersfield Line. It was featured in the Government's plans for the railway in November 2017 and in July 2018 further details were revealed as part of the Connecting Leeds Vision with the consultation inviting opinions from the general public. It is anticipated by the developers that Cottingley railway station will close due to the proximity of the two stations.

History

Leeds City Council are considering whether to retain Cottingley station or to close it, when White Rose opens. Speculation about the closure of Cottingley railway station has only been from the community who have pointed out that the station attracts only 265 passengers a day on average.

The station is to be financed from the £173.5 million Department for Transport money that was given to Leeds City Council but left without portfolio when the trolleybus scheme across Leeds was denied permission by Patrick McLoughlin. The funds needed to be used by the financial year 2020–2021.

The station was approved by Leeds City Council in June 2020, with two platforms and a service pattern of two trains per hour in each direction. The developers stated that this will probably lead to the closure of the nearby Cottingley railway station, and whilst this was not initially confirmed by Northern, Leeds City Council or the Department for Transport, confirmation of the station closure came in October 2021. Construction of the new station is expected to be completed in spring 2023, with an estimated cost of £26.5 million. Each platform will be capable of accepting six carriage trains, with scope to expand the length to accommodate eight car trains. The scheme anticipates a footfall of 340,000 people per year.

References

External links
Station plans

Proposed railway stations in England